Kemal Türkler (1926 – 22 July 1980) was a Turkish socialist labor union leader. He was founder and first president of Confederation of Revolutionary Trade Unions of Turkey (Türkiye Devrimci İşçi Sendikaları Konfederasyonu, DISK), and also one of the founders of the Workers Party of Turkey (Türkiye İşçi Partisi, TİP) in 1963.

He worked as a metal worker for a long time. He became president of Turkey's Metal Workers' Union (Türkiye Maden-Iş). He was a leading figure of the democratic trade union movement in Turkey.

Kemal Türkler was assassinated on 22 July 1980 in front of his home in Merter, İstanbul by ultra-nationalist MHP militants.

See also

 List of assassinated people from Turkey

References

1926 births
People from Denizli
Leaders of political parties in Turkey
1980 deaths
Assassinated Turkish politicians
People murdered in Turkey
Turkish trade unionists
Workers' Party of Turkey politicians
Istanbul University Faculty of Law alumni
Burials at Topkapı Cemetery
Political violence in Turkey